

See also 
 1804 Maryland's 4th congressional district special election
 United States House of Representatives elections, 1804 and 1805
 List of United States representatives from Maryland

Notes

References 

1804
Maryland
United States House of Representatives